The brownish twistwing (Cnipodectes subbrunneus), also known as the brownish flycatcher, is a species of bird in the Tyrannidae. It was the only member of the genus Cnipodectes until the description of Cnipodectes superrufus in 2007.

Distribution and habitat
It is found in Bolivia, Brazil, Colombia, Ecuador, Panama, and Peru.  Its natural habitat is subtropical or tropical moist lowland forests.

References

brownish twistwing
Birds of Panama
Birds of the Tumbes-Chocó-Magdalena
Birds of the Amazon Basin
Birds of the Colombian Amazon
Birds of the Peruvian Amazon
brownish twistwing
brownish twistwing
Taxonomy articles created by Polbot